Frailea curvispina is a species of Frailea from Brazil.

References

External links
 
 

curvispina